Loutro is a rocky islet in the gulf of Loutro on the southwest coast of Crete in the Libyan Sea. The islet can be found close to the end of the Mouri cape. Administratively, it is part of the municipality of Sfakia. The gulf of Loutro was once used for shipbuilding and by merchant ships.

Ancient Foinikas

Loutro is believed to be part of ancient Foinikas and the port of ancient Anopolis. It became the winter harbour of Sfakia. The gulf and the islet make a natural harbour where ships can be safe even in the worst of weather.

Shipbuilding
The gulf of Loutro was once used for shipbuilding by the people of Sfakia and the local sailors used to travel throughout the Mediterranean, and as far away as Russia, from Loutro. Shipbuilding, sailing, and navigation contributed to the local economy. One of the successful shipbuilders and shipowners was Ioannis Vlachos, who was better known as Daskalogiannis. He was a wealthy shipbuilder with four large three-mast ships that sailed between the ports of the Mediterranean.

See also
List of islands of Greece

References

Sources
 

Landforms of Chania (regional unit)
Uninhabited islands of Crete
Mediterranean islands
Islands of Greece